SS Waratah was a passenger and cargo steamship built in 1908 for the Blue Anchor Line to operate between Europe and Australia. In July 1909, on only her second voyage, the ship, en route along the coast of the Colony of Natal (part of modern-day South Africa) from Durban to Cape Town, disappeared with 211 passengers and crew aboard. No trace of the ship has ever been found and her fate remains unknown.

Design and construction
In September 1907 W. Lund & Sons placed an order with Barclay Curle of Glasgow for a new cargo and passenger vessel to be delivered within 12 months that was specially designed for their Blue Anchor Line trade between the United Kingdom and Australia. The owners wanted the ship to be an improved version of their existing steamer , and therefore most specifications were based upon those of Geelong. The vessel was laid down at Barclay Curle's Clydeholm Yard in Whiteinch and launched on 12 September 1908 (yard number 472), with Mrs J. W. Taverner, wife of the Agent-General of Victoria, being the sponsor.

The ship was of the spar-deck type and had three complete decks—lower, main and spar. The first-class accommodations were built on the promenade, bridge and boat decks and could house 128 passengers. In addition, a nursery was provided on the ship for first-class passengers' convenience. The vessel also had third-class passenger accommodations constructed on the poop deck that could house upward of 300 people but were certified for only 160. Waratah was constructed for both speed and luxury and had eight state rooms and a salon whose panels depicted its namesake flower, as well as a luxurious music lounge complete with a minstrel's gallery. With an intent of being also an emigrant ship, her cargo holds would be converted into large dormitories capable of holding almost 700 steerage passengers on the outward journeys, while on the return the steamer would be laden with general cargo, mainly frozen meat, dairy products, and wool and metal ore from Australia. In order to be able to carry frozen produce, her entire front end was fitted with refrigerating machinery and cold chambers. She also had Kirkcaldy's distilling apparatus, capable of producing  of fresh water a day, installed on board. At the time of construction, Waratah was not equipped with a radio, which was not unusual at the time.

After successful completion of sea trials, the ship was transferred to her owners on the same day and immediately departed for London.

Waratah had a cellular double bottom built along her entire length, and the hull was divided into eight watertight compartments, which it was claimed rendered her "practically immune from any danger of sinking."

The ship was named after the emblem flower of New South Wales, which appears to have been an unlucky name: one ship of that name had been lost off the island of Ushant in the English Channel in 1848, one in 1887 on a voyage to Sydney, another south of Sydney, and one in the Gulf of Carpentaria in 1897.

Operational history

Following delivery, Waratah left London for her maiden voyage on 5 November 1908 with 689 third-class and 67 first-class passengers. She touched off at Cape Town on 27 November and arrived at Adelaide on 15 December 1908. Among her passengers were Hamilton Wickes, a newly appointed British Trade Commissioner for the Commonwealth, Dr. Anderson, Bishop of Riverina and Octavius Beale, president of the Federal Council of Chambers of Manufactures.

While on her maiden voyage, early in the morning of 6 December 1908, the second officer reported a small fire in the lower starboard bunker extending all the way to the engine room. The fire was largely brought under control by noon on the same day but continued reigniting until 10 December. The fire was apparently caused by the heat emitted by several reducing and steam valves located on the starboard side of the engine room. While the roof of the engine room was insulated, the starboard side evidently was not. The repairs were performed at Sydney to the chief engineer's satisfaction.

From Adelaide the steamer proceeded to Melbourne and Sydney and sailed back for London on 9 January 1909 via Australian, Colony of Natal and Cape Colony ports carrying a cargo of foodstuffs, wool, and 1,500 tons of metal concentrates. Waratah arrived in London on 7 March 1909 to finalize her maiden voyage, and after unloading her cargo, was put into drydock where she was inspected by the Lloyd's inspector and underwent some minor repairs.

During her maiden trip the steamer was scrutinized by the Captain and the crew, as one of the criteria used in acceptance trials was the ship's handling and stability. Captain Ilbery was not completely satisfied and, considering he was previously in charge of Geelong, presumably reported to the owners that the ship did not have the same stability as his old vessel. He was especially concerned with the difficulty of properly loading the steamer to maintain her stability, which resulted in a heated exchange between the owners and the builders following the vessel's return to England. The subsequent inquiry into her sinking raised some disputed reports of instability on this voyage.

On 27 April 1909 Waratah set out on her second trip to Australia carrying 22 cabin, 193 steerage passengers in addition to a large cargo of general merchandise, and had a crew of 119. The outward trip was largely uneventful, and the steamer arrived at Adelaide on 6 June after touching off at Cape Town on 18 May. Upon loading approximately 970 tons of lead ore at Adelaide, the steamer continued to Melbourne and had to plough through a strong gale which also complicated her berthing upon arrival there on 11 June. She continued on to Sydney where she loaded her cargo for the return voyage, consisting among other things of flour, wool, dairy, frozen meat, and 7,800 bars of bullion, and departed on 26 June. She stopped to complete her loading at Melbourne and Adelaide and set out from Adelaide on 7 July bound for the Colony of Natal port of Durban, on to the Cape Colony port of Cape Town and continuing to Europe. Aside from almost 100 passengers, she also had on board a convict being extradited to Transvaal Colony, accompanied by two Transvaal policemen.

Waratah reached Durban on the morning of 25 July, where one passenger, Claude G. Sawyer, an engineer and experienced sea traveller, left the ship and sent the following cable to his wife in London: "Thought Waratah top-heavy, landed Durban". Sawyer later testified to the London inquiry that he had booked passage on Waratah through to Cape Town, but had decided to disembark at Durban, as he had been nervous about the behaviour of the ship during his voyage. He also claimed that he had been disturbed by visions he saw in dreams during the voyage of a man "dressed in a very peculiar dress, which I had never seen before, with a long sword in his right hand, which he seemed to be holding between us. In the other hand he had a rag covered with blood." Sawyer claimed that he took these visions to be a warning to leave the ship at the earliest opportunity. In any event his decision to leave the ship at Durban saved his life.

Disappearance
The Waratah left Durban at approximately 20:15 on 26 July with 211 passengers and crew. At around 04:00 on 27 July she was spotted astern on the starboard side by the Clan Line steamer Clan MacIntyre. As Waratah was the faster ship she drew level with Clan MacIntyre by about 06:00, at which point both vessels communicated by signal lamp, and exchanged customary information about the name and destination of their respective ships. Waratah, going approximately 13 knots, then overtook Clan MacIntyre at a location abeam of the mouth of the Bashee River on southeast coast of the Colony of Natal. Waratah remained in sight of Clan MacIntyre, gradually steaming away until she disappeared over the horizon by about 09:30. This was the final confirmed sighting of Waratah. Later that day the weather deteriorated quickly (as is common in that area) with increasing wind and rough seas, this had developed into a hurricane by 28 July. The captain of the Clan MacIntyre said it was the worst weather he had experienced at sea in his 13 years as a seaman, with winds of exceptional strength causing tremendous seas.

There were several further unconfirmed sightings:   

At around 17:30 on the 27th, a ship called the Harlow saw the smoke of a steamer on the horizon. There was so much smoke that her captain wondered if the steamer was on fire. When darkness fell, the crew of the Harlow could see the steamer's running lights approaching, but still  behind them. Suddenly there were two bright flashes from the direction of the steamer and the lights vanished. The captain thought they were caused by explosions but the mate of the Harlow, who had also seen them, thought the flashes were brush fires on the shore (a common phenomenon in the area at that time of year). The captain agreed and did not even enter the events in the log – only when he learnt of the disappearance of the Waratah did he think the events significant.

That same evening at around 21:30 the Union-Castle Liner Guelph, heading north to Durban from the Cape of Good Hope, passed a ship and exchanged signals by lamp, but because of the bad weather and poor visibility was able to identify only the last three letters of her name as "T-A-H."

Another possible sighting, which was not disclosed to the Inquiry at the time, was by Edward Joe Conquer, a Cape Mounted Rifleman who on 28 July 1909, was posted to carry out military exercises on the banks of the mouth of the Xora River along with Signaller H. Adshead. He recorded in his diary that he and Adshead had observed through a telescope a steamship which matched the description of the Waratah that appeared to be struggling slowly against heavy seas in a south-westerly direction. Conquer observed the ship roll heavily to starboard, and then before it was able to right itself, a following wave rolled over the ship, which then disappeared from view, leading Conquer to believe it had gone under. He reported his sightings to his base camp and to his Orderly Sergeant, who apparently did not take the matter seriously. He did not come forward with his story until 1929.

The Waratah was expected to reach Cape Town on 29 July 1909, but never reached its destination. No trace of the ship has ever been found.

Search efforts

Contemporary searches
Initially, the non-appearance of the ship did not cause alarm as it was not uncommon for ships to arrive at port days, or occasionally even weeks overdue. As Waratah was considered unsinkable, it was at first thought likely that she had been delayed by a breakdown or mechanical fault, and was still adrift. Fears started to grow for her safety, when ships which had left Durban after Waratah and had travelled on a similar course began arriving at Cape Town, and reported having seen no sign of her en route. The first search effort was launched on 1 August, when the tugboat T.E. Fuller was sent out to look for any sign of the ship, but was forced to turn back after encountering dreadful weather. She later returned to search along the coast. The Royal Navy deployed cruisers  and HMS Forte (and later ) to search for the Waratah. The Hermes, near the area of the last sighting of the Waratah, encountered waves so large and strong that she strained her hull and had to be placed in dry dock on her return to port. On 10 August 1909, a cable from Colony of Natal reached Australia, reading "Blue Anchor vessel sighted a considerable distance out. Slowly making for Durban. Could be the Waratah". The Chair of the House of Representatives in the Australian Parliament halted proceedings to read out the cable, saying: "Mr. Speaker has just informed me that he has news on reliable authority that the SS Waratah has been sighted making slowly towards Durban." In Adelaide, the town bells were rung, but the ship in question was not the Waratah.

Numerous other ships in the area joined the search, including the Waratahs sister ship Geelong which deviated from its course from Cape Town to Adelaide, to search waters east of Colony of Natal where the Waratah was thought to be possibly drifting. The German steamship Goslar also kept special lookout for Waratah for 1262 miles of ocean while en route from Port Elizabeth to Melbourne.

On 13 August 1909 the steamship Insizwa reported sighting of several bodies off the mouth of Bashee (Mbashe) River, near the location of the last confirmed sighting of the Waratah. The Captain of the Tottenham also allegedly saw bodies in the water, more than two weeks after the Waratah disappeared. The tug Harry Escombe was sent out to search for the bodies, but failed to find any; it did however find floating objects which resembled human bodies, which turned out to be dead skate.

Hope remained that Waratah was still afloat and drifting; this was bolstered by the experience of the steamer SS Waikato which had in 1899 broken down off the Cape, and had drifted eastwards for over 100 days covering , before being discovered and towed to Australia. Waratah had enough provisions on board to last for a year, however as she lacked any radio equipment, she would have been unable to communicate with any ships beyond visual range. In September 1909, the Blue Anchor Line chartered the Union Castle cargo ship Sabine to search for the Waratah. The Sabine was specially fitted out with search lights and other equipment. Its search covered , and zig-zagged across the drift path of the aforementioned Waikato but yielded no result. With no sighting of the ship for over four months, Waratah was officially posted as missing at Lloyd's of London on 15 December 1909. However, in early 1910, relatives of Waratah passengers made one further attempt to locate the ship, and chartered the Wakefield which conducted a search for four months covering , this again proved unsuccessful.

No confirmed wreckage or bodies from the Waratah have ever been found, although there were a number of unconfirmed reports: Wreckage was reported to have been found at Mossel Bay in March 1910. A life preserver reportedly marked with the name 'Waratah' washed up on the coast of New Zealand in February 1912. In 1925 Lt. D. J. Roos of the South African Air Force reported that he had spotted a wreck while he was flying over the Transkei coast. It was his opinion that this was the wreck of the Waratah. Pieces of cork and timber, possibly from the Waratah, were washed up near East London, South Africa in 1939.

Later search attempts
A number of attempts at locating a wreck have taken place, in particular under the leadership of Emlyn Brown. Attempts to locate the Waratah took place in 1983, 1989, 1991, 1995 and 1997. In 1999 reports reached the newspapers that the Waratah had been found 10 km off the eastern coast of South Africa. A sonar scan conducted by Emlyn Brown's team had indeed located a wreck whose outline seemed to match that of the Waratah. In 2001, however, a dive to the site revealed that the wreck was in fact that of the Nailsea Meadow, a merchant cargo ship that had fallen victim to a German U-boat during the Second World War. In 2004 Emlyn Brown, who had by then spent 22 years looking for the Waratah, declared that he was giving up the search: "I've exhausted all the options. I now have no idea where to look", he said.

Inquiry
The Board of Trade inquiry into the disappearance was held in December 1910 at Caxton Hall in London. It quickly came to focus on the supposed instability of the Waratah. Evidence was greatly hampered by the lack of any survivors from the ship's final voyage (other than the small number, including Claude Sawyer, who had disembarked in Durban). Most evidence came from passengers and crew from Waratah's maiden voyage, her builders and those who had handled her in port.

The expert witnesses all agreed that the Waratah was designed and built properly and sailed in good condition. She had passed numerous inspections, including those by her builders, her owners, the Board of Trade and two by Lloyd's of London, who gave her the classification "+100 A1" – their top rating, granted only to ships Lloyds had inspected and assessed throughout the design, construction, fitting out and sea trials, on top of the two valuations and inspections Lloyds had made of the completed Waratah.

However, many witnesses who had travelled on the ship testified that the Waratah felt unstable, frequently listed to one side even in calm conditions, rolled excessively, and was very slow to come upright after leaning into a swell, and had a tendency for her bow to dip into oncoming waves rather than ride over them. One passenger on her maiden voyage said that when in the Southern Ocean she developed a list to starboard to such an extent that water would not run out of the baths, and she held this list for several hours before rolling upright and then settling down to a similar list on the other side. This passenger, physicist Professor William Bragg, concluded that the ship's metacentre was just below her centre of gravity. When slowly rolled over towards one side, she reached a point of equilibrium and would stay leaning over until a shift in the sea or wind pushed her upright.

Other passengers and crew members commented on her lack of stability, and those responsible for handling the ship in port said she was so unstable when unladen that she could not be moved without ballast. But for every witness of this opinion, another could be found who said the opposite. Both former passengers and crew members (ranking from stokers to a deck officer) said the Waratah was perfectly stable, with a comfortable, easy roll. Many said they felt she was especially stable. The ship's builders produced calculations to prove that even with a load of coal on her deck (that several witnesses claim she was carrying when she left Durban) she was not top heavy.

The inquiry was unable to make any conclusions from this mixed and contradictory evidence. It did not blame the Blue Anchor Line, but did make several negative comments in regard to the company's practices in determining the performance and seaworthiness of its new ships. Correspondence between Captain Ilbery and the line's managers show he commented on numerous details about the ship's fixtures, fittings, cabins, public rooms, ventilation and other areas, but failed to make any mention at the basic level of the Waratah's seaworthiness and handling. Equally, the company never asked Captain Ilbery about these areas. This led some to speculate that Ilbery had concerns about the Waratah and its stability, but deliberately kept such doubts quiet. However, it is also possible that neither he nor the Blue Anchor Line felt it necessary to cover such areas, because the Waratah was heavily based on a previous (and highly successful) Blue Anchor ship, the Geelong, and so the Waratah's handling was assumed to be the same.

It is certainly true that many passenger ships of the period were made slightly top-heavy. This produced a long, comfortable but unstable roll, which many passengers preferred to a short, jarring but stable roll. Many trans-Atlantic liners were designed this way, and after a few voyages those operating them learnt how to load, ballast and handle them correctly and the ships completed decades of trouble-free service. It may have been the Waratah's misfortune to encounter an unusually heavy storm or freak wave on only her second voyage, before she could be trimmed correctly. This slightly top-heavy design could also account for the strongly opposed opinions of witnesses about whether or not the ship felt stable. An inexperienced or uninformed person on the ship might conclude that the long, slow, soft roll of the ship felt comfortable and safe, whilst someone with more seagoing experience or a knowledge of ship design would have felt that the same motion was unstable. In regards to the witnesses claiming the Waratah's instability in port when unladen, this may have been true. However, virtually all ocean-going ships (which are, after all, designed to carry a large weight of cargo) need to be ballasted to some extent when moved unladen, so the Waratah was certainly not unique in this respect. The witnesses would have been well aware of this – that they still came forward to attest that they regarded the Waratah as dangerously unstable in these conditions does suggest that the ship was exceptional in some respect.

The Waratah was also a mixed-use ship. Passenger liners, with a small cargo volume relative to their gross register tonnage had fairly constant and predictable ballasting requirements. A ship like the Waratah would carry a wide range of cargoes, and even different cargoes on the same voyage, making the matter of ballasting both more complex and more crucial. When she disappeared, the Waratah was carrying a cargo of 1,000 tons of lead concentrate, which may have suddenly shifted, causing the ship to capsize.

The inquiry concluded that the three ships reporting potential sightings of the Waratah on the evening of 26 July could not all have seen her given the distance between them and the time of the sightings, unless the Waratah had reached Mbashe River and exchanged signals with the Clan MacIntyre but then turned around and headed back to Durban, to be sighted by the Harlow.

Theories

Theories which have been put forward to explain the disappearance include:

Freak wave
A theory advanced to explain the disappearance of the Waratah is an encounter with a freak wave, also known as a rogue wave, in the ocean off the South African coast. Such waves are known to be common in that area of the ocean. It is most likely that the Waratah, with what seems to be marginal stability and already ploughing through a severe storm, was hit by a giant wave. This either rolled the ship over outright or stove in her cargo hatches, filling the holds with water and pulling the ship down almost instantly. If the ship capsized or rolled over completely, any buoyant debris would be trapped under the wreck, explaining the lack of any bodies or wreckage in the area. This theory was given credibility through a paper by Professor Mallory of the University of Cape Town (1973) which suggested that waves of up to 20 metres (66 feet) in height did occur between Richards Bay and Cape Agulhas. This theory also stands up if the Waratah is assumed to have been stable and seaworthy – several ships around the Cape of Good Hope have been severely damaged and nearly sunk by freak waves flooding their holds. Throughout the world ships such as Melanie Schulte (a German ship lost in the Atlantic Ocean)  and MV Derbyshire (a British bulk carrier sunk in the Pacific Ocean) have suddenly broken up and sunk within minutes in extreme weather.

Some have also suggested that instead of sinking, the ship was incapacitated by a freak wave and, having lost her rudder and without any means of contacting land, was swept southwards towards Antarctica to either be lost in the open ocean or founder on Antarctica itself. No evidence except the absence of the wreck supports this theory.

Cargo shift
The Waratah was carrying in her cargo holds around 1,000 tons of lead and 300 tons of lead ore concentrate, which is known under certain circumstances to liquefy due to the motion of the ship. This can affect the stability of the ship due to the free surface effect, potentially causing it to capsize. Today, ore concentrate is treated as hazardous cargo, with special measures required for its transport in ships; however, in 1909 there was little awareness about the dangers of carrying this material.

Whirlpool
Both at the time of the disappearance and since, several people have suggested that the Waratah was caught in a whirlpool created by a combination of winds, currents and a deep ocean trench, several of which are known to be off the southeast coast of Africa. This would explain the lack of wreckage, but there is no firm evidence that a whirlpool of sufficient strength to almost instantly suck down a  ocean liner could be created as suggested.

Explosion
Given the evidence from the officers of the Harlow (see above), it has been speculated that the Waratah was destroyed by a sudden explosion in one of her coal bunkers. Coal dust can certainly self-combust and in the right proportions of air be explosive. However, no single bunker explosion would cause a ship the size of the Waratah to sink instantly, without anyone being able to launch a lifeboat or raft, and without leaving any wreckage.

Aftermath
The Waratah's disappearance, the inquiry and the criticism of the Blue Anchor Line generated much negative publicity. The line's ticket sales dropped severely and, coupled with the huge financial loss taken in the construction of the Waratah (which, like many ships of the time, was under-insured), forced the company to sell its other ships to its main competitor P&O and declare voluntary liquidation in 1910.

In 1913, a Brisbane newspaper, The Daily Mail, suspected its competitor The Daily Standard was copying its news stories. So the Daily Mail published a hoax article claiming that the Waratah had been discovered in Antarctica. The Daily Standard also published the story and added a statement from the harbourmaster.

Memorials

A plaque in the Parish Church at Buckland Filleigh, Devon, England, commemorates Col. Percival John Browne. He was returning to England on the Waratah, from his sheep farm in Mount Gambier, South Australia. His family home was Buckland House.

A plaque to the memory of Howard Cecil Fulford, the ship's surgeon, was erected in the chapel by his fellow students at Trinity College (University of Melbourne).

In the Parish Church of St Wilfrid, Bognor Regis, England, is a plaque: "The church gates were given in memory of Harris Archibald Gibbs who was drowned at sea in the SS Waratah".

In the main church in Aberystwyth, Wales, is a plate "in happy memory of John Purton Morgan, 3rd Officer SS Waratah lost at sea 1909".

A memorial in Higher Cemetery, Exeter, Devon, commemorates Thomas Newman "drowned in SS Waratah 27th July 1909".

A centenary plaque was unveiled at the Queenscliffe Maritime Museum, Victoria, Australia, on 27 July 2009.

Cultural impact
As such the Waratah has been referred to variously as the "Titanic of the southern seas" or the "Titanic of the south" or alternatively "Australia's Titanic".

See also
List of people who disappeared mysteriously at sea

References
Notes

Bibliography

Further reading
"The Loss of the Waratah", The Times, 23 February 1911 p. 24
Esther Addley, "Sea yields our Titanic's Resting Place", The Weekend Australian, 17 July 1999
Sue Blane, "The Week in Quotes", Financial Times, 6 May 2004
Alan Laing, "Shipwreck expert abandons hunt for Clyde liner", The Herald, 4 May 2004
Tom Martin, "Almost a century after she vanished, scientists could now be on the verge of solving riddle of SS Waratah'''s last voyage", Sunday Express, 25 April 2004
Geoffrey Jenkins' Scend of the Sea'' (Collins, 1971) is a novel based on the loss of the Waratah.

External links

S/S Waratah on the wrecksite
NUMA on Waratah
Waratah Crew list 
Waratah Passenger list 
December 1910 inquiry into loss of Waratah .pp.101–105
 Buffalo City tourism

1900s missing person cases
1908 ships
Australian folklore
Cargo liners
Iron and steel steamships of Australia
Maritime incidents in 1909
Missing person cases in Africa
Missing ships of Australia
People lost at sea
Passenger ships of Australia
Ships lost with all hands
Shipwrecks of South Africa